KCWH may refer to:

 KCWH-LD, a low-power television station (channel 18) licensed to serve Lincoln, Nebraska, United States
 KHWA, a radio station (102.3 FM) licensed to serve Weed, California, United States, which held the call sign KCWH from 2008 to 2012